Bhavan's Tripura Vidya Mandir is a private LKG–12, CBSE-affiliated school run by the Bharatiya Vidya Bhavan Educational Trust in Agartala, Agartala, Tripura. Founded in 1996, it is the first Bhavan's school to be set up in Tripura.

The school functions under the purview of the Agartala Kendra of the Bharatiya Vidya Bhavan, which also runs two other schools & three college in and around Agartala

Campus
The school's facilities include library, computer lab, science lab, an auditorium and hostel for both boys and girls. The sports complex has facilities for: cricket, football, swimming pool, table tennis, and badminton.

Academic year and timings
The school academic year commences in April and ends in March. The school runs in two shifts. Nursery to Class V in the first shift, and Class VI to Class XII in the second shift.
 First shift timings: 07.00 A.M. to 12.00 P.M.
 Second Shift timings: 10.00 A.M. to 04.00 P.M

Notable alumni
Sourabhee Debbarma

References

Private schools in Tripura
Education in Agartala
Educational institutions established in 1996
1996 establishments in Tripura